William Stanley Fox (4 July 1906 – 20 August 1979) was an English footballer.

Career
Fox started his career with Sheffield United in 1929. After making no league appearances for the club, he joined Bury in 1930. He joined York City in 1931. After leaving the club, he received a benefit match against Southport in May 1938.

He worked for Cooke, Troughton & Sims and British Rail until he retired in 1971.

Notes

1906 births
Footballers from Sheffield
1979 deaths
English footballers
Association football defenders
Association football midfielders
Sheffield United F.C. players
Bury F.C. players
York City F.C. players